Steven P. Guenette (born November 13, 1965) is a retired Canadian professional ice hockey goaltender who played 35 games in the National Hockey League for the Pittsburgh Penguins and Calgary Flames.

Playing career
Guenette signed with the Penguins in 1985 after two seasons in the Ontario Hockey League with the Guelph Platers. He remained in the OHL for one more season in 1985–86, where he led the Platers to the J. Ross Robertson Cup title, and then the 1986 Memorial Cup championship. Guenette won the Leo Lalonde Memorial Trophy as the OHL's top over-ager, as well as the Hap Emms Memorial Trophy as the top goaltender in the Memorial Cup, in addition to being named to the Memorial Cup All-Star team.

Guenette broke into the NHL the following year, playing two games with the Penguins in 1986–87. He played 30 more games in Pittsburgh over the next two seasons. Spending most of his time in the International Hockey League where he won the James Norris Memorial Trophy for allowing the fewest goals in the IHL and was named a second-team all-star after recording a 23–4–5 record for the Muskegon Lumberjacks in 1987–88.

The Penguins traded Guenette to the Calgary Flames in 1989 for a sixth round draft pick. He spent two seasons in the Flames organization, appearing in only three games for Calgary, and after a final season with the Kalamazoo Wings in 1991–92, retired from professional hockey.

Personal life
Guenette has a favourite nephew. Justin Jarmoc, Bishop's University graduate, who currently works for McCabe Promotional Advertising in their Ottawa West office.

References

External links

1965 births
Living people
Baltimore Skipjacks players
Calgary Flames players
Canadian expatriate ice hockey players in the United States
Canadian ice hockey goaltenders
Guelph Platers players
Ice hockey people from Ottawa
Kalamazoo Wings (1974–2000) players
Muskegon Lumberjacks players
Pittsburgh Penguins players
Salt Lake Golden Eagles (IHL) players
Undrafted National Hockey League players